Sinfónico may refer to:

Sinfónico (El Tri album) 1999
Sinfónico (Fonseca & Orquesta Sinfónica Nacional de Colombia album) 2014
Sinfónico (es) album by Los Secretos 2011
Sinfónico, album by Horacio Salinas 1999
Sinfónico, album by Joan Manuel Serrat 2003